{{Infobox election
| election_name = Most recent Screen Award winners
| election_date = Best in film in 2019
| type = primary
| ongoing = 2056
| previous_election = 25th Screen Awards
| previous_year = 2018
| next_election = 
| next_year = 2022
| 1blank = Award
| 2blank = Winner
| image1 = Ranveer at filmfare (cropped).jpg
| image1_size = 160px
| 1data1 = Best Actor
| 2data1 = Ranveer Singh(Gully Boy)
| image2 = Alia Bhatt at Mukesh Ambani’s residence for Ganesh Chaturthi celebration (20) (cropped).jpg
| image2_size = 160px
| 1data2 = Best Actress
| 2data2 = Alia Bhatt(Gully Boy)
| image4 = File:Gulshan Devaiya at a special screening of Lipstick Under My Burkha (cropped).jpg
| image4_size = 160x160px
| 1data4 = Best Supporting Actor
| 2data4 = Gulshan Devaiah(Mard Ko Dard Nahin Hota)
| image5 = Kamini Kaushal.jpg
| image5_size = 160px
| 1data5 = Best Supporting Actress
| 2data5 = Kamini Kaushal(Kabir Singh)
| image7 = File:Zoya at audio release of Talaash.jpg
| image7_size = 160px
| 1data7 = Best Director
| 2data7 = Zoya Akhtar(Gully Boy)
| image8 = Prem Chopra speaking.jpg
| image8_size = 160px
| 1data8 = Lifetime Achievement Awardee
| 2data8 = Prem Chopra
| title = Best Picture
| before_election = Stree
| after_election = Gully Boy}}
The Screen Awards was an annual awards ceremony held in India honouring professional excellence in Bollywood. The nomination and award selection is done by a panel of distinguished professionals from the industry. The awards were introduced by the Screen film magazine of The Indian Express Group in 1995. The magazine was acquired by Star India in 2015 and subsequently closed down. Though Star India continues to sponsor the awards under the Star Screen Awards title.

The name of the annual ceremonies are prefixed by the presenting network; the first "Star Screen Awards" were telecasted on Star Plus from 2000 till 2011, after which the "Colors Screen Awards" were previewed on Colors and the "Life OK Screen Awards" on Life OK, each for a period of two years. As of 2019, Star continues to hold the television distribution rights.Vanita Kohli-Khandeka, The Indian Media Business,  SAGE Publications India, 1 August 2008

History
The Screen Awards, initiated by the chairman of The Express Group, Mr. Viveck Goenka in 1994, is focused on excellence in films in India. The awards attempt to position themselves as India's first awards that are given by the film fraternity to the film fraternity by way of a jury, as opposed to the other "popular" awards. The awards are also the first to be conducted every year.

The Awards for Hindi and Marathi films, TV and non-film music are presented annually in January each year. Several editions of the awards such as the "Screen Weekly Awards", "Screen Videocon Awards", "Star Screen Awards", "Colors Screen Awards" and "Life OK Screen Awards" have thus far been presented. Until 2001, the awards were sponsored by Videocon International and hence known as the Screen Videocon Awards. For the regional cinema of South India, Screen has held three editions of the "Screen Awards for excellence in South Indian Cinema". The awards were presented for Tamil, Telugu, Malayalam and Kannada cinema.

The ceremony has involved the executive director and the Governor of the Academy of Motion Picture Arts and Sciences.

The 23rd Star Screen Awards was held on 4 December 2016 and broadcast on Star Plus on 31 December 2016. The event was created and designed by Anil Jha and produced and executed by Mohomed Morani and Cineyug Group of Companies.

Awards
Jury Awards
 Best Film
 Best Director
 Best Actor
 Best Actress
 Best Supporting Actor
 Best Supporting Actress
 Best Villain
 Best Comedian
 Best Music Director
 Best Lyricist
 Best Male Playback
 Best Female Playback
 Most Promising Newcomer - Male
 Most Promising Newcomer – Female

 Critics' Awards 
 Best Actor (Critics)
 Best Actress (Critics)

Technical Awards
 Best Story
 Best Screenplay
 Best Dialogue
 Best Background Music
 Best Editing
 Special Effects
 Best Art Direction
 Best Action
 Best Cinematography
 Best Choreography
 Best Sound Design

Special Awards
 Lifetime Achievement
 Jodi No. 1
 Best Child Artist
 Special Jury Award
 Best Fresh Talent
 Screen Award Best Jodi of Decade
 Screen Award for Showman of the Millennium - Raj Kapoor (2002)
 Screen Award for Best Performer of The Year - Ekta Kapoor (2012)
 Screen Legend of Indian Cinema Award - Amitabh Bachchan (2013)

Retired Awards
 Best Actor (Popular Choice)
 Best Actress (Popular Choice)
 Entertainer of the Year     (2010–12,13,19)
 Best Animation Film (2009)
 Best Film in English (2009)

Records and factsMost awards to a single film Dangal - 12
Gully Boy - 12Devdas - 11Most directing awards Sanjay Leela Bhansali  - 3
 Ashutosh Gowariker - 2
 Rakesh Roshan - 2Most acting awards - male (Best Actor + Best Supporting Actor) in chronological order.
 Amitabh Bachchan     (4+0)   = 4
 Shahrukh Khan    (4+0)   = 4
 Hrithik Roshan     (4+0)   = 4
 Anil Kapoor  (1+2)   =3
 Saif Ali Khan(0+3)   =3Most acting awards - female (Best Actress + Best Supporting Actress) in chronological order.
 Vidya Balan      (5+0)   = 5
 Madhuri Dixit    (3+1)   = 4Most awards for music direction A.R. Rahman               = 5
 Pritam                    = 4
 Shankar–Ehsaan–Loy        = 3Most Lyricist Awards Javed Akhtar              = 5
 Gulzar                    = 4
 Anand Bakshi              = 3
 Prasoon Joshi             = 3Most playback singer awards - male Arijit Singh              = 4
 Sonu Nigam                = 3
 Sukhwinder Singh          = 2
 Rahat Fateh Ali Khan      = 2Most playback singer awards - female Shreya Ghoshal            = 7
 K.S.Chithra (includes for South Indian languages)  = 3
 Kavita Krishnamurthy      = 2
 Alka Yagnik               = 2
 Sunidhi Chauhan           = 2Youngest Best Actress Winner Alia Bhatt for Udta Punjab aged 23Youngest Best Actor Winner''
 Hritik Roshan for Kaho Naa... Pyaar Hai aged 27

See also
 Hindi cinema
 Cinema of India

References

External links

 Screen India website
 List of winners from 1994-2000
 Star Screen Awards Streaming on Hotstar

 
Bollywood film awards
1995 establishments in Maharashtra
Awards established in 1995